Patrician Brothers' College, Fairfield (abbreviated as PBCF) is an independent Roman Catholic comprehensive single-sex secondary day school for boys, located in Fairfield, a western suburb of Sydney, New South Wales, Australia.

Founded in the tradition of Bishop Daniel Delany in 1953, the college formerly catered for students in Years 5 to 12, however the primary section was merged into the local parish primary school and closed in 2006. Today the school enrolls approximately 1150 high school aged students from the parishes of Villawood, Fairfield, Cabramatta and Smithfield. 85% of the student population are from non-English speaking backgrounds. The administration of the school is overseen by Sydney Catholic Schools.

In the 2009 Higher School Certificate (HSC), the college was ranked in the top 57 schools in New South Wales, and is ranked in the Top 12 Catholic Schools in Sydney and in the Top 3 Catholic Schools in the Southern Region.

History

Establishment 
In August 1948, the Brothers received a letter from Archbishop O'Brien on behalf of Norman Cardinal Gilroy, requesting staff for a new boys' school planned for Fairfield. At this time, Fairfield was an outer and rapidly expanding suburb of Sydney with a large concentration of post war migrants from Europe. While there was a primary convent school at nearby Cabramatta, Smithfield and Villawood, there was no opportunities for senior primary and secondary Catholic Education for boys in Fairfield.

Provincial, Brother Norbert and his Council agreed to the Cardinal's request and Brother Kevin Samuel, Brother Eugene Kelly and Brother Peter Johnson (Superior and Principal) formed the first Patrician Community at Fairfield. The Brothers took up residence in an old weatherboard cottage which was on the 10 hectare property, which had recently been acquired by the Archdiocese as a site for the school.

When Cardinal Gilroy blessed the monastery and officially opened the school on 13 March 1953, there were 170 pupils enrolled in Years 4, 5 and 6, in a year, this number almost doubled. The original classrooms were in brick, and separated by concrete quadrangles with trees everywhere. That pattern of building was retained and was repeated regularly to cope with the expanding enrolment which ten years later had reached almost one thousand. The grounds in which the school was situated were a disused orchard and vineyard – uneven and ungrassed and abounding in powdery surface soil. In the early sixties, the Brothers, supported by parents and students, embarked on a levelling, grass-planting and tree-planting campaign which was the foundation of the environment in which today's large complex is situated.

From six classrooms in 1953, the pupil accommodation has grown to over forty classrooms in 1982, as well as a library and assembly hall, science laboratories, a modern manual arts block and various other specialist facilities.  The college is the largest single campus enrolment of any Boys' Catholic School in New South Wales.

Early developments 
In the early days, the students were mainly of established Australian background with a strong representation of children of East European parents as well as Maltese and Italians of fairly significant but there is a very large second generation Italian and Maltese group of students now, as well as many students of East European, Middle East, South American and Indo-Chinese background.

1956 was the year in which the students sat for the first public examination – the Intermediate Certificate – for candidates of present Year 9 age. The Intermediate level was the terminating year in the school until 1961, when the first group of students sat for the Leaving Certificate. This development marked a significant event in the life of the school as the first Leaving Certificate class contained students from Patrician Brothers' Schools at Blacktown, Granville and Liverpool. This intake of students from other Patrician Schools for their final years of secondary schooling continued until these areas gained their own senior secondary school.

Golden Jubilee 
In 2003, Patrician Brothers' College celebrated its 50th Golden Jubilee year. The celebrations included a Golden Jubilee Opening Mass at St. Mary's Cathedral, Sydney, presided by Cardinal George Pell and concelebrated by priests from Fairfield, Cabramatta, Smithfield and Villawood parishes, as well as priests who are old boys of the college. Other celebrations included an Old Boys' Reunion Dinner and a staff reunion, a golden jubilee ball and a concert, plus closing ceremony in December.

21st Century 
On 25 June 2000, several years of construction on the campus came to an end with the official opening and blessing of the new College facilities and classrooms. The old Year 8, 9, 10, and Primary blocks made way for an entirely new complex of buildings including a new library, Science wing, College hall and gymnasium, and Music and Creative Arts centre. The old senior block was completely renovated, what was once the College hall and library became the administration and staff areas. These facilities have continually been improved, with the refurbishment of the Science Centre, the introduction of lifts and WiFi within the college.

Primary school closure 
In 1993 the primary school of the College moved across the creek to take up residence at the Weston Street Campus, then occupied by Our Lady of the Rosary, Primary School. A Brother remained Principal there until 2003.

The Catholic Education Office decided that the Weston Street campus was unsustainable for the growing primary school. There were proposals to remerge the Primary School with the Secondary College. However, the Catholic Education Office decided that the most viable option was to allow students in Years 5 & 6 to continue their education with their feeder primary schools.

At the end of 2006, Patrician Brothers' College Primary School closed, and the grounds were returned to the Our Lady of the Rosary Parish to use. Patrician Brothers' College Primary School Fairfield was the last primary school to close which was affiliated with the Patrician Brothers. However, Our Lady of the Rosary Primary School Fairfield is currently under Patrician Leadership.

World Youth Day cross and icon 
 Patrician Brothers' College was chosen to be the first school in Australia to host the World Youth Day (WYD) cross and icon upon its arrival in Australia for the Sydney 2008 World Youth Day celebrations. The Catholic Archdiocese of Sydney entrusted the Western Deanery (officially, a geographical region in South-West Sydney that comprises 16 Sydney Archdiocese parishes) with the WYD cross and icon for the day of 2 July 2007. The WYD cross and icon was hosted Patrician Brothers College, Fairfield for three hours that day for public veneration, which was attended by 5,000 people.

Patrician bicentenary celebrations 
The Patrician Brothers were established by Bishop Daniel Delany in 1808 in the Name of St Patrick and in 2008, the Patrician Brothers celebrate their 200th anniversary. The following Patrician linked schools joined in and celebrated the Patrician bicentenary:
 Holy Cross College Ryde
 All Saints Catholic College, Liverpool
 Patrician Brothers' College Blacktown
 Delany College

The college has had two major bicentenary celebrations:
 St. Patrick's Day – a mass was held at the State's Sport Centre on 17 March, with over 5000 people attending – celebrated by Bishop David Cremin and guests included the Superior General of the Patrician Order, Brother Jerome, the entire Patrician Brothers Congregation of NSW and abroad and members of parliament.
 Patrician Bicentenary Concert – this was celebrated on 30 April, at Acer Arena with musical performances from all the patrician colleges.
 Concluding Mass – The concluding Mass was held in Tullow Ireland (the birthplace of the Patrician Order) and was attended by various Brothers of the Patrician Order and Principals of Patrician schools from across the globe.

Headmasters

Patrician Principals

Lay Principals 

In 2001, the last Patrician Principal of the college, Br. Bernard Bulfin, retired, and was replaced by the college's first lay principal, Michael Krawec, ending 48 years of leadership by the Brothers of St. Patrick. However, Br. Nicholas Harsas remained as principal of Patrician Brothers' Primary, until 2003 when he was replaced by Warren Loy. The primary closed at the end of 2006.

During 2007, Michael Krawec, was appointed to the Catholic Education Office and the governors elected Wayne Marshall as the temporary Principal. At the end of 2007 the CEO appointed John Killeen to principalship. In 2016 Peter Wade, once a student at the college, became Principal.

Facilities

Learning facilities 
Patrician Brothers' College spent six years and $14m redeveloping and rebuilding classrooms, Jubilee Hall, music, IT, visual arts, science, administration, technology and applied studies centres and the college chapel.

Technology 
The college is currently undertaking a five-year technology roll over period. The College recently purchased and installed new computers in the Information and Technology Centre, new laptops and light probe projectors, 5 portable projection systems which are used for student presentations in the ITC, TAS and science blocks, a new computer lab in the science block, and several touch sensitive SmartBoards. Technology is being incorporated in all lessons and is utilised as a teaching aid in the senior school. Additional fixed SmartBoard and Data Projector units have been installed in over 90% of the student learning areas and classrooms.

With the provision of the Rudd Government's "Digital Education Revolution" Patrician Brothers College Fairfield will be one of the first schools to provide specially customized Apple MacBook's to over 400 Years 9 and 10 students in 2009. In commitment to this scheme, all students who enter Year 9 at the college will be provided with their own personal laptop computer to be used through their remaining time at the college. In 2011, Year 7 and 8 students are to purchase their own Apple MacBooks due to a policy change within the current Gillard Government.

To facilitate this rollout scheme, the college has implemented wireless WiFi network in 2009–2010. This $40 000 project seeing new wireless access points being installed across campus and Intranet capabilities being expanded to cover 95% of the school grounds including the school oval. Electrical infrastructure such as digital projectors have also been installed on the entire college campus.

Curriculum

Gifted and talented 
The curriculum incorporates enrichment and the opportunity of extension in all courses. Acceleration is possible in individual courses (such as Mathematics and Mathematics Extension 1 and 2). Acceleration has proven successful for the college, with many of its students achieving Band 6s in their accelerated courses.

Sport 
The college was once involved in the Metropolitan Catholic Schools (MCS) Competitions and now  competes in the newly established Sydney Catholic Schools sports competition. Patrician Brothers' is also involved in the Combined Catholic Colleges, State Competitions and other competitions including the Parramatta Knockout.  The College has been a dominant figure in the NRL Schoolboy Cup winning it 6 times, whilst winning the NRL Schoolboy Trophy Cup in 2018. Most recently , the college has gone on to win the 2022 Peter Mulholland Cup.

Mock trial 
The 2007 Mock trial team was the most successful in the Patrician Brothers' College, Fairfield history, winning the Sydney regional competition, against schools such as The King's School and other private and selective schools.

Debating 

The 2008 Debating Senior Debating team completed another first for the college, becoming the first side to take the NSW Catholic State Title for Patrician Brothers' College.

Tournament of Minds 

The college has had a multitude of success with its involvement in the nationwide 'Tournament of Minds' competition held annually for selected Yr 7–10 students, testing both intellectual wit and creative thinking across a range of disciplines ranging from Maths and Engineering, Language and Literature, Applied Technology and Social Science.

In 2006, for the first time in the school's history, it won the regional finals, becoming State Finalists in the Maths and Engineering category. Then, the college achieved another first, again making it into the State Finals in 2008, however this time in the Applied Technology category. The college's success had however only just begun, with the same team taking out Tournament Honours and coming 2nd in the State Final in 2009 for Applied Technology. Remarkably, in 2010, the college would again achieve unprecedented success with the Maths and Engineering team taking Tournament Honours and coming 2nd in the State Final. Being the college's greatest success in the competition so far, it has inspired a new wave of students to pit their skills against the top students in the State.

House system 
In 2004 Patrician Brothers' College Fairfield implemented its new house system. The new houses are:
 Freeman – Black House
 MacKillop  – White House
 Therry     – Blue House
 Dixion     – Red House
 Polding    – Green House
 Gilroy     – Gold House
 Tullow    -Purple House

Students are each assigned to a house upon their commencement at the college. Students are divided into house groups for morning and afternoon homeroom and participate in carnivals in their house group. Students of all grades are offered chances to win points for their respective Houses through participation in various sporting and extracurricular activities. As of 2007 the College sports uniform now includes House colour polo shirts which are to be worn during sporting lessons and at swimming carnivals. In 2023, the college introduced the new house of Tullow.

Notable alumni 
Alumni of Patrician Brothers' College are known as 'Old Boys' and may elect to join the schools alumni association, the Old Boys' Union. The goal of the Old Boys' Union is to foster and maintain friendships made at the college, and contribute to tradition by donating resources and prizes for special events.
Some notable Patrician Brothers' College Old Boys include:

 Greg Alexander – former rugby league player and Fox Sports commentator
 David Bradbury – former Mayor of Penrith; MP for the Division of Lindsay in Western Sydney
Nathan Brown – current rugby league player for the Parramatta Eels
 Walter Bugno – businessman
 Nick Carle – former Joey and Olyroo; Socceroo; Crystal Palace (England – Championship)
 Joseph Carrozzi  – Football Australia; Chairman of Finance, Risk and Audit Committee. Western Sydney University Board Member and Strategic Business Advisor.
 Garen Casey – former rugby league player and Australian Schoolboy
 Dean Collis – former rugby league player and Australian Schoolboy
 David Danes – former superleague player and Australian Schoolboy
 Manase Fainu – current Rugby league player, for Manly Sea Eagles
 Buddy Farah – former Soccer player and current Football Agent
 Emanuele Fuamatu – 2012 Olympian, 2012 Australian Shot Put Champion
 Andrew Frew – former rugby league player
 Nathan Gardner – Cronulla Sharks in the NRL
 Scott Geddes- former rugby league player
 Kieran Gilbert – journalist 
 Glenn Grief – former rugby league player and Australian Schoolboy
 Joey Grima – former National Rugby League and Super League coach
 Tim Gilbert – journalist 
  Kieron Herring – former rugby league player and Australian Schoolboy
 Ian Hindmarsh- former rugby league player
 Nathan Hindmarsh – former Parramatta Eels player; former NSW and Australia representative
 Steven Jolly – former rugby league player 
 Paul Langmack – former professional rugby league footballer, now coach
 Mark Levy- former rugby league player and  ABC commentator
 Brett Lobb- former rugby league player
 Max Mannix- former rugby league player and Australian Schoolboy
 Michael Masi- former F1 director and current Chairman of the Supercars Commission in Australia.
 Warren McDonnell- former rugby league player and current Football Operations & Recruitment Manager for the Wests Tigers
 Andrew McIlwaine- former rugby league player and Australian Schoolboy
 Daniel Merza- award-winning international speaker and author
 D'Rhys Miller- Fiji national rugby league team representative
 Marcelo Montoya – current New Zealand Warriors player
 Justin Morgan (rugby league) – former rugby player and current coach
 Mitch Newton – former rugby league player
 Remo Nogarotto – football (soccer) administrator 
 Paul Okon – former Socceroos captain; Olyroos Squad Barcelona '92; Former Newcastle Jets FC captain
 Taniela Paseka- current Rugby league player, for Manly Sea Eagles
 Darren Pettet- former rugby league player
 Ronny Palumbo – current rugby league player for London Broncos
 Dietrich Roache- represented Australia in the Rugby 7's
 Ben Roberts- former rugby league player and Australian Schoolboy
 Peter Sharne – former Socceroo; Marconi
 Chris Smith – former 2GB broadcaster
 Peter Sterling  – former Parramatta Eels player; former NSW and Australia representative; former commentator  for Nine Network and member of the Sport Australia's Hall of Hame. Order of Australian Medal recipient
 Justin Truong – Co-Founder & CEO of PUSHAS. Forbes 30 Under 30 2022 (Asia – Retail & Commerce)
 Michael Wenden  – Australian swimming champion and Gold medal Olympian
 Kyle White – former rugby league  player and Australian Schoolboy
 Wade Russel – former rugby league player and Australian Schoolboy
 Francis Vaiotu – former rugby league player
 Michael Vella – former rugby league player, NSW and Australian Representative 
 Paul Zadro – Chairman of the International Sports Karate Association in Australia 
 David Zdrilic – former Olyroo; Capped Socceroo; Sydney FC
 Bernard Zuel – journalist

See also 

 List of Catholic schools in New South Wales
 Patrician Brothers
 Catholic education in Australia

References

External links
 Patrician Brothers' College website
 Patrician Brothers' Primary website
 Brothers' of St.Patrick

Patrician Brothers schools
Educational institutions established in 1953
Catholic secondary schools in Sydney
Boys' schools in New South Wales
Roman Catholic Diocese of Parramatta
1953 establishments in Australia